Hjørdis is a spin-off of the Danish TV series Rita. It follows school teacher Hjørdis as she tries to put together a school play about bullying.

Cast

Episodes

External links 
 
 Hjørdis at TV2 Denmark

2015 Danish television series debuts
2010s school television series
Television spin-offs
2015 Danish television series endings
Television series about bullying
Danish-language television shows
TV 2 (Denmark) original programming